Rosalie Boyd (born 21 October 1987), is an Australian handball player for Queensland HC and the Australian national team and beach handball national team.

She participated at the 2011 World Women's Handball Championship in Brazil. She also competed at the 2013 World Women's Handball Championship. Most recently she captained the beach national team at World Games in Cali, Colombia where the team finished 7th.

References

1987 births
Living people
Australian female handball players